Trunk 4 is part of the Canadian province of Nova Scotia's system of Trunk Highways. The route runs from Highway 104 exit 7 near Thomson Station to Glace Bay.  Until the construction of the Trans-Canada Highway, Trunk 4 was a major traffic link in northern Nova Scotia and Cape Breton, and is still used on Cape Breton as an alternative to Highway 105. 
The highway was originally called the King's Highway, however, this name is no longer applied to the entire road.  The only remaining historic section of the highway that maintains the name "King" is King's Road in Sydney.

Route description (west to east)

Thomson Station to Glenholme
The section between the western terminus at Exit 7, Highway 104 in Thomson Station to Mahoneys Corner was originally built as Highway 104 in the 1960s.  It was bypassed by the Cobequid Pass in 1997 and redesignated Trunk 4 at that time. The section between Mahoneys Corner and Glenholme was originally part of Trunk 4 until the 1960s when it was designated Highway 104. This section was also redesignated Trunk 4 in 1997 after the opening of the Cobequid Pass.

Glenholme to Onslow
The section between Glenholme and Onslow is co-designated with Trunk 2.  Trunk 4 is discontinuous between Exit 14A, Highway 102 in the west and Pictou Road in Bible Hill in the east.

Bible Hill to Barney's River Station
Trunk 4 reappears in Bible Hill, following Pictou Road and the original Trunk 4 alignment east.  In Kemptown, Trunk 4 follows an old alignment of Highway 104 for several kilometres.  Trunk 4 continues east of Kemptown on its original alignment through Mount Thom to Salt Springs.  From Salt Springs to Westville, the present alignment of Trunk 4 was used as Highway 104 from the 1960s until being bypassed in the 1990s.  Now redesignated Trunk 4, the highway designation continues into Westville on Truro Road and then Westville Road.  In New Glasgow it follows the original Trunk 4 route on Westville Road, Stellarton Road, George Street, Archimedes Street, Marsh Street and Merigomish Road before heading east toward Sutherlands River.  At Sutherlands River, Trunk 4 follows a new alignment between School Rd and Highway 245.  It then continues east to Barney's River Station.

Marshy Hope to South River Station
Trunk 4 is discontinuous between Barney's River Station and Marshy Hope as Highway 104 uses the old Trunk 4 alignment for this section.  From Marshy Hope, Trunk 4 proceeds east to Antigonish.  In Antigonish, it follows Post Road, James Street, Main Street, and St Andrews Street.  East of Antigonish it proceeds to South River Station.

Heatherton to Auld's Cove
Trunk 4 is discontinuous between South River Station and Heatherton as Highway 104 mostly uses the old Trunk 4 alignment.  From Heatherton, Trunk 4 proceeds east to Auld's Cove.

Port Hastings to Glace Bay
Trunk 4 is discontinuous between Auld's Cove and Port Hastings as Highway 104 uses the old Trunk 4 alignment.  From Port Hastings, Trunk 4 proceeds east through Port Hawkesbury and St. Peter's before turning northeast along the southeastern shore of Bras d'Or Lake through Big Pond and Ben Eoin.  It continues east to Sydney River to Sydney.  In Sydney it follows Kings Road, Esplanade Road, Welton Street. East of Sydney it continues along Grand Lake Road to Reserve Mines and Glace Bay. In Glace Bay it follows Reserve Street and Union Street and ends at the intersection of Union and Commercial Streets.

Blue Route
Because a large portion of the highway has been paralleled by the faster Highway 104, traffic volumes are comparatively light. As a result, parts of Trunk 4 are currently under review to become part of Nova Scotia's Blue Route, a designated cycling corridor.

History
Trunk 4 originally started at the New Brunswick border in Fort Lawrence. In the early years of the Trans-Canada Highway system, Trunk 4 was the designated Trans-Canada Highway route across mainland Nova Scotia. When controlled-access sections of Highway 104 were first built in the 1960s, the number replaced Trunk 4 entirely west of New Glasgow. As four-lane sections of Highway 104 were built in the late 1990s, the number 4 was again used to mark the former Mount Thom and Wentworth Valley sections of 104.

Original sections of historic Trunk 4 (west to east)

NB-NS border to Monastery
 part of Cumberland Loop in Fort Lawrence serving the Nova Scotia Dept of Tourism visitor information centre is a former Trunk 4 alignment
 Laplanche Street in Fort Lawrence
 Laplanche Street, Church Street, and Albion Street in Amherst
 Trunk 2 from Amherst to Springhill
 Highway 321 from Springhill to Oxford
 Highway 204 from Oxford to Streets Ridge (old road alignment visible at realigned intersection)
 Highway 368 from Streets Ridge to Mahoneys Corner
 current section of Trunk 4 from Mahoneys Corner to Glenholme
 Glenholme Road in Glenholme
 current section of Trunk 4/Trunk 2 from Glenholme to Masstown (old road alignment visible at realigned intersection)
 current section of Trunk 4/Trunk 2 from Masstown to Tidal Bore Road in Onslow
 Tidal Bore Road to Meadow Drive (old bridge - old road alignment visible from Highway 102)
 Robie Street, Juniper Street, Prince Street, and Walker Street in Truro
 Main Street to Pictou Road in Bible Hill
 Pictou Road in Bible Hill and Valley
 current section of Trunk 4 from Valley to Kemptown
 Loop Old Highway 4 in Kemptown
 current section of Trunk 4 from Kemptown to Westville with some minor exceptions
 Truro Road and Westville Road in Westville
 Westville Road, Stellarton Road, George Street, Archimedes Street, Marsh Street and Merigomish Road in New Glasgow
 current section of Trunk 4 from Linacy to Sutherlands River
 School Road in Sutherlands River
 current section of Trunk 4 across Sutherlands River (old bridge - old road alignment visible at realigned intersection)
 current section of Trunk 4 from Sutherlands River to Barneys River Station
 Robertson Road at Barneys River Station
 current section of Highway 104 from Barneys River Station to Marshy Hope (old road alignment visible at some places along this section)
 current section of Trunk 4 from Marshy Hope to Addington Forks
 old road alignment visible at realigned intersection in Addington Forks
 Post Road, James Street, West Street, Main Street, St Andrews Street in Antigonish
 current section of Trunk 4 from Antigonish to South River Road
 current section of Highway 104 from South River Road to Lower South River
 unused old road alignment visible in Taylors Road
 Dagger Woods Road in Dagger Woods
 Heatherton Village Road in Pomquet Forks and Heatherton
 current section of Trunk 4 from Heatherton to Monastery

pre-1955 (Monastery - Port Hawkesbury)
 current section of Trunk 4 from Monastery to Aulds Cove
 current section of Route 344 from Aulds Cove to Mulgrave
 Prior to the 1930s current section of Old Mulgrave Road from Monastery to Mulgrave
 Wallace Street in Mulgrave
 public car ferry operated by NS Dept of Highways from Mulgrave to Port Hawkesbury; Mulgrave slip located between Wallace Street and Dale Avenue; Port Hawkesbury slip located at foot of MacSween Street
 MacSween Street, Granville Street, and Sydney Road in Port Hawkesbury

post-1955 (Monastery - Port Hawkesbury)
 current section of Trunk 4 from Monastery to Aulds Cove
 current section of Highway 104 in Aulds Cove
 current section of Highway 104 across Canso Causeway
 current section of Trunk 4 from Port Hastings to Port Hawkesbury
 Reeves Street and Sydney Road in Port Hawkesbury

Port Hawkesbury to Glace Bay
 current section of Trunk 4 from Port Hawkesbury to River Tillard
 old road alignment visible at realigned intersection in River Tillard
 current section of Trunk 4 from River Tillard to Sydney River (with exception of new alignment build in Irish Cove in the 1970s)
 Kings Road in Sydney River
 Kings Road, Esplanade Road, Prince Street, Welton Street in Sydney
 current section of Trunk 4 / Grand Lake Road to Reserve Mines
 Sydney Road in Reserve Mines
 Reserve Street in Glace Bay
 Union Street in Glace Bay

Major intersections

See also
 List of Nova Scotia provincial highways

External links
 East Bay Highway Cam
 Irish Cove Highway Cam

References

004
004
004
004
004
004
004
004
004
Antigonish, Nova Scotia
Transport in New Glasgow, Nova Scotia
Former segments of the Trans-Canada Highway